An adventure film is a form of adventure fiction, and is a genre of film. Subgenres of adventure films include swashbuckler films, pirate films, and survival films. Adventure films may also be combined with other film genres such as action, comedy, drama, fantasy, science fiction, family, horror, war, or the medium of animation.

Overview
Setting plays an important role in an adventure film, sometimes itself acting as a character in the narrative. They are typically set in far away lands, such as lost continents or other exotic locations. They may also be set in a period background and may include adapted stories of historical or fictional adventure heroes within the historical context. Such struggles and situations that confront the main characters include things like battles, piracy, rebellion, and the creation of empires and kingdoms. 

A common theme of adventure films is of characters leaving their home or place of comfort and going to fulfill a goal, embarking on travels, quests, treasure hunts, heroic journeys; and explorations or searches for the unknown. Subgenres of adventure films include swashbuckler films, pirate films, and survival films. Adventure films may also be combined with other film genres such as action, animation, comedy, drama, fantasy, science fiction, family, horror, or war.

History
In the early days of adventure films, the  protagonists were typically male. These characters were courageous, often seen as heroes fighting suppression and facing tyrants. More recent adventure films have featured heroines, such as Lara Croft, as protagonists.

Adventure film popularity peaked in the 1930s and 1940s, when films such as Captain Blood, The Adventures of Robin Hood, and The Mark of Zorro were regularly made with major stars, notably Errol Flynn and Tyrone Power, who were closely associated with the genre. Saturday morning serials used many of the same thematic elements as high-budget adventure films.

Early influential adventure film creators were Douglas Fairbanks (The Mark of Zorro, The Three Musketeers, Robin Hood, The Black Pirate), Zoltan Korda (The Four Feathers, Jungle Book, Sahara, The Macomber Affair) and John Huston (The Treasure of the Sierra Madre, The African Queen).

See also
Adventure game
Lists of adventure films
Travel documentary

References

External links
 

Adventure films
Film genres